WMNG (104.9 FM) is a radio station licensed to serve Christiansted, U.S. Virgin Islands. The station is owned by Clara Communications Corporation and operated by JKC Communications.  It airs a classic hits music format.

The Federal Communications Commission assigned this station the call letters WAQW on February 7, 1997. This designation was short-lived as the station switched to the current WMNG call letters on September 26, 1997.

Construction permit
WMNG is currently a class A station broadcasting with 6,000 watts of effective radiated power in a non-directional pattern from an antenna 213 meters above the average terrain. On September 20, 2007 they applied to become a more powerful class B station broadcasting with 30,000 watts of effective radiated power from a directional antenna 230 meters in height above average terrain. The proposed new pattern will protect Puerto Rico from interference by this station's broadcast signal. A construction permit authorizing these changes was granted by the FCC on October 14, 2008, and is set to expire on October 14, 2011, if the upgrade is not completed.

References

External links
 WMNG official website
 
 
 

MNG
Classic hits radio stations in the United States
Radio stations established in 1997
1997 establishments in the United States Virgin Islands
Saint Croix, U.S. Virgin Islands